Polyommatinae, the blues, are a diverse subfamily of gossamer-winged butterflies (family Lycaenidae).

This subfamily was long used to assign taxa of unclear relationships, and its contents and phylogeny are still in need of revision.
The following four tribes are generally recognized within Polyommatinae, with Polyommatini comprising most of the genera and species:
 Candalidini Eliot 1973
 Lycaenesthini Toxopeus 1929
 Niphandini Eliot 1973
 Polyommatini Swainson 1827

References

External links
 
 Tolweb.
 Butterflies and Moths of North America
 Butterflies of America

 
Taxa named by William John Swainson
Butterfly subfamilies